is a newspaper published in Mexico City. The newspaper was founded by Rómulo O'Farril, and ownership still remains in his family.

Until 2002, it published an English language sister paper called The News.

Rosario Sansores Pren, Lolo de la Torriente, and others have written articles for this newspaper.

See also
List of Mexican newspapers

External links
(es) Official website

Newspapers published in Mexico City
Spanish-language newspapers